Haroub Mohamed Shamis (born 5 March 1962) is a Tanzanian CUF politician and Member of Parliament for Chonga constituency since 2010.

References

Living people
1962 births
Civic United Front MPs
Tanzanian MPs 2010–2015
College of Business Education alumni
Zanzibari politicians